The Ministry of Water and Environment (MWE), is a cabinet-level government ministry of Uganda. It is responsible for the "sound management and sustainable utilisation of water and environment resources for the betterment of the population of Uganda". The ministry is headed by Minister Sam Cheptoris.

Location
The headquarters of the ministry are located on Port Bell Road, in the neighborhood of Luzira, in the Nakawa Division of Kampala, Uganda's capital and largest city. The coordinates of the ministry headquarters are 0°17'56.0"N,  32°38'56.0"E (Latitude:0.298889; Longitude:32.648889).

Subministries
The minister is assisted by two ministers of state.

 Minister of State for Water:  Ronald Kibuule
 Minister of State for the Environment: Mary Goretti Kitutu

Organisational structure
Administratively, the ministry is divided into three directorates:

 Directorate of Water Resources Management
 Directorate of Water Development
 Directorate of Environmental Affairs

Autonomous agencies
The ministry works very closely with the following autonomous government agencies, in the effort to achieve its mandate.

 National Forestry Authority
 The Department of Climate Change
 National Environmental Management Authority
 National Water and Sewerage Corporation

List of ministers
 Sam Cheptoris (6 June 2016 - present)
 Ephraim Kamuntu (15 August 2012 - 6 June 2016)
 Maria Mutagamba (1 June 2006 - 15 August 2012)
 Kahinda Otafiire (2003 - 1 June 2006)

See also
Politics of Uganda
Parliament of Uganda

References

External links
 

Government ministries of Uganda
Uganda
Uganda